The First Run Festival is an annual event showcasing over 120 intermediate and advanced projects in film, video, and animation. It is presented by the Kanbar Institute of Film & Television. and held in New York City. The event first ran in 1986. The selection runs a gamut of undergraduate and graduate films ranging between narratives, documentaries and animation produced during the filmmakers' time in the program. The work is evaluated by a trio of juries: a three-judge Undergraduate Intermediate panel looks at submissions from junior level courses; Graduate and Undergraduate Industry each have six-judge panels. The selections are then sent toward the respective faculty panels to announce the final top three winners.

This annual week-long festival begins with the Craft Awards Ceremony and Wasserman Finalists Announcement and culminates with the Wasserman Awards Ceremony featuring the Charles and Lucille King Family Foundation Awards. The students' films and videos compete annually for over $50,000 in cash awards. Following First Run each year, the Wasserman Award finalist films and videos are screened in Hollywood for industry professionals and the public. Past years' showcases had been held at the Directors Guild of America.

References

External links
First Run Film Festival Site
Tisch School of the Arts - Film & Television

Film festivals in New York City
Student film festivals